Salavatovo (Salawat) is a rural locality (a village) in Tashtimerovsky Selsoviet, Abzelilovsky District, Bashkortostan, Russia. The population was 323 as of 2010. There are 5 streets.

Geography 
Salavatovo is located 16 km northeast of Askarovo (the district's administrative centre) by road. Kuzhanovo is the nearest rural locality.

References 

Rural localities in Abzelilovsky District